Oscar "Oca" Samson Rodriguez (born September 19, 1945) was the mayor of San Fernando, Pampanga in the Philippines from 2004 until his maximum third term in 2013. Rodriguez was formerly a member of Lakas-Kampi-CMD but switched to Liberal Party during the 2010 Philippine general elections.

Rodriguez is currently the president of the League of Cities of the Philippines, chairman of the Regional Development Council of Central Luzon, and vice president of the Union of Local Authorities of the Philippines. He is the founding president of Movement for the Advancement of Young Advocates of Pampanga, and was a prosecutor during the impeachment trial of former President Joseph Estrada.

Rodriguez was also the representative of 3rd District of Pampanga from 1987–1992 and again from 1995-2004. He authored several laws, including:
The Republic Act 8990, an act that converted the Municipality of San Fernando, Pampanga into a component city that is now known as the City of San Fernando
The Republic Act 9225, The Dual Citizenship Law providing for overseas Filipinos to participate in political processes
The Republic Act 9211, The Tobacco Regulation Act of 2003
The Republic Act 9173 which seeks to strengthen the Nursing Profession in the Philippines
He has also authored bills that seeks prohibition of political dynasties and amendments to the illegal discharge of firearms.

In 2005 he was one of the finalists for World Mayor.

Early life and education

Rodriguez graduated elementary course in San Pablo Elementary School and is an alumnus of Pampanga High School. Rodriguez began his career in law as a stenographer in  Toledano Colleges (now East Central Colleges) before graduating from Pampanga’s Harvardian Colleges with a Bachelor of Arts degree in 1969 and with a law degree from Far Eastern University in 1973.

Personal life

Rodriguez is married to Dolores Pineda Pabustan and has five children.

References

External links
profile [age

1945 births
Kapampangan people
People from San Fernando, Pampanga
Living people
Members of the House of Representatives of the Philippines from Pampanga
Lakas–CMD politicians
Liberal Party (Philippines) politicians
Mayors of places in Pampanga
20th-century Filipino lawyers
Far Eastern University alumni
Recipients of the Presidential Medal of Merit (Philippines)